Morford is a surname. Notable people with the surname include:

Craig S. Morford (born 1959), American jurist
Jerome Morford (1841–1910), American Civil War veteran
Jill Morford, American linguist
Mark Morford, American columnist

See also
Horford